The Qing dynasty (1636–1912) of China developed a complicated peerage system for royal and noble ranks.

Rule of inheritance

In principle, titles were downgraded one grade for each  generation of inheritance.

 Direct imperial princes with the Eight Privileges were downgraded for four generations, after which the title can be inherited without further downgrades.
 Direct imperial princes without the Eight Privileges were downgraded until the rank of feng'en jiangjun, which then became perpetual.
 Cadet line imperial princes and lords were downgraded until they reached feng'en jiangjun, which could be further inherited three times before the title expired completely.
 For non-imperial peers, the title could be downgraded to en jiwei before becoming perpetually heritable.

Occasionally, a peer could be granted the privilege of shixi wangti ("perpetual heritability"), which allowed the title to be passed down without downgrading. Throughout the Qing dynasty, there were 12 imperial princely families that had this privilege. They were known as the "iron-cap princes".

The noble titles were inherited through a system of loose primogeniture: The eldest son from the peer's first wife was usually the heir apparent, but inheritance by a younger son, a son of a concubine, or brother of the peer was not uncommon. According to their birth (by the chief consort, secondary consort or concubines) and their father's rank, non-heir sons of imperial princes were also entitled to petition for a lower title than the one they would have received had they been the heir. Non-heir sons of other peers were also occasionally granted a lower title.

Whether imperial or not, the inheritance or bestowal was never automatic, and had to be approved by the Emperor, the Ministry of Personnel, or the Imperial Clan Court. Imperial princes, upon reaching adulthood at the age of 20, had to pass tests in horse-riding, archery and the Manchu language before they were eligible for titles. Imperial princesses, other than the Emperor's daughters, were usually granted titles upon marriage, regardless of age. Princesses' titles were also usually fixed after they were granted, and were not affected by changes in their fathers' nobility ranks.

Grading system
Yunjiwei ("sub-commander of the cloud cavalry") was originally a military rank created in the Sui dynasty, but it was later turned into a military honour in the Tang dynasty as part of the xun guan system. The Qing dynasty abolished the separate military honour system and merged it into the nobility rank system, using yunjiwei as the lowest grantable rank of nobility, and the basic unit of rank progression.

For example, a yunjiwei who received another grant of yunjiwei became a jiduwei. A first-class duke plus yunjiwei was the equivalent of 23 grants of yunjiwei.

Official rank (pin)
The Qing dynasty, much like previous dynasties, used an "official rank" system. This system had nine numbered ranks, each subdivided into upper and lower levels, in addition to the lowest "unranked" rank: from upper first pin, to lower ninth pin, to the unranked, for a total of 19 ranks. All government personnel, from the highest chancellors to the lowest clerk, held an official rank ex officio, which determined their salary, uniform, privileges and order of precedence.

This pin system existed in parallel to the noble ranks detailed in this article. Many higher noble titles ranked above this system. And while some titles corresponded to a pin, they were considered equivalents of convenience rather than actual official ranks.

Titular names
Historically, Chinese noble titles were usually created with a shiyi (fief) each, although the fief could be only nominal. The Hongwu Emperor of the Ming dynasty enfeoffed cadet branch princes and other nobles in different regions of China. The Qing dynasty ended this tradition; with only a few exceptions, no fief was ever named. No Qing prince was enfeoffed with territory. Instead, noble titles were created without a name, or were bestowed a meihao (titular name). These names were usually descriptive of the peer's merit, virtue, or the circumstances leading to his ennoblement. The Dukes Yansheng kept their traditional fief in Shandong under Qing rule.

Titular names were unique for imperial princes, while non-imperial peers' titular names may overlap. Following Ming dynasty tradition, single-character names were reserved for qinwangs, while junwangs used two-character names. All other peers normally had two-character names, but could receive up to four characters.

Since noble titles were primarily awarded for military service, the titular names predominantly described martial virtues, e.g., zhongyong gong ("loyal and brave duke"). However, a particularly common titular name was cheng'en gong ("duke who receives grace"), which was frequently granted to the Empress's family members.

Imperial clan

Eight Privileges
At the top of the imperial hierarchy, the highest six ranks enjoyed the "Eight Privileges" (jakūn ubu). These privileges were:

 Promotional books inscribed on jade, set of seals for correspondence, red carriage wheels, purple horse reins, right for reported entry, red walls of the residence, use of corner lanterns, use of leopard tail guns.
 Precious stones on the mandarin hat crests, clothes with encircled dragon patterns, use of imperial porcelain tea sets, purple reins, red wheels, doornails on the gate, employment of guards.
 Finials on mandarin hats embellished with precious stones, use of two-eyed peacock feather, surcoats with encircled dragon patterns, purple reins, right to enter the imperial palace by horse, leopard tail guns, separate manor in the capital, employment of officials and eunuchs.

Peacock feathers, however, were prohibited for princes above the rank of beizi and direct imperial clansmen. The "Eight Privileges" entitled the prince to participate in state councils and share the spoils of war. However, the prince was also bound to reside in the capital and render service to the imperial court. 
In 1816, the princes were forbidden from reporting matters via eunuchs. Thus, most of the princes employed officials as managers of domestic affairs. The range of tasks of those officials included conveyance of memorials on behalf of the prince. The supervisor of princely manor held lower 4 rank in 9-pin system.

Male members
 Heshuo qinwang (hošo-i cin wang), commonly simplified to qinwang, translated as "Prince of the First Rank" or "Prince of the Blood". "Heshuo" ("hošo") means "four corners, four sides" in Manchu.
 Shizi (šidzi), meaning "heir son", refers to the heir apparent to a qinwang.
 Duoluo junwang (doro-i giyūn wang), commonly simplified to junwang, translated as "Prince of the Second Rank" or "Prince of a Commandery".
 Zhangzi (jangdzi), meaning "eldest son" or "chief son", refers to the heir apparent to a junwang.
 Duoluo beile (doro-i beile), means "lord", "prince" or "chief" in Manchu, commonly simplified to beile, and translated as "Prince of the Third Rank", "Venerable Prince", or "Noble Lord". "Duoluo" ("doro") means "virtue, courtesy, propriety" in Manchu. It was usually granted to the son of a qinwang or junwang. As beile is the best known Manchu, non-Chinese title, it is commonly used to refer to all Manchu princes.
 Gushan beizi (gūsa-i beise), commonly simplified to beizi, and translated as "Prince of the Fourth Rank", "Banner Prince" or "Banner Lord". "Gushan" ("gūsai") means "banner" in Manchu, a reference to any of the Eight Banners. "Beizi" ("beise") is the plural form of "beile", but since 1636, "beile" and "beizi" were used to refer to two different ranks of nobility.

The four ranks above were granted solely to direct male-line descendants of the Emperor. These titles below were granted to cadet lines of the imperial clan.

 Feng'en zhenguo gong ( kesi-be tuwakiyara gurun-be dalire gung), translated as "Duke Who Receives Grace and Guards the State", simplified to "Duke Who Guards the State", also translated as "Defender Duke by Grace" or "Duke of the First Rank".
 Feng'en fuguo gong ( kesi-be tuwakiyara gurun-de aisilara gung), translated as "Duke Who Receives Grace and Assists the State", simplified to "Duke Who Assists the State", also translated as "Bulwark Duke by Grace" or "Duke of the Second Rank".

The above six ranks are titles that enjoy the "Eight Privileges". The titles below do not enjoy the "Eight Privileges" and have no imperial duties.

 Burubafen zhenguo gong ( jakūn ubu-de dosimbuhakū gurun-be dalire gung), translated as "Duke Without the Eight Privileges Who Guards the State", also translated as "Lesser Defender Duke" or "Duke of the Third Rank".
 Burubafen fuguo gong ( jakūn ubu-de dosimbuhakū gurun-be aisilara gung), translated as "Duke Without the Eight Privileges Who Assists the State", also translated as "Lesser Bulwark Duke" or "Duke of the Fourth Rank".

All of the above titles are chaopin, outranking official ranks. The ranks below are ranked first to fourth pin respectively. The first three jiangjun ranks are each further subdivided into four classes: first class plus yunjiwei, first class, second class, and third class.

 Zhenguo jiangjun (gurun be dalire janggin), translated as "General Who Guards the State", "Defender General", or "(Hereditary) General of the First Rank".
 Fuguo jiangjun (gurun de aisilara janggin), translated as "General Who Assists the State", "Bulwark General", or "(Hereditary) General of the Second Rank".
 Fengguo jiangjun (gurun be tuwakiyara janggin), translated as "General Who Receives the State", "Supporter General", or "(Hereditary) General of the Third Rank".
 Feng'en jiangjun (kesi-be tuwakiyara janggin), translated as "General Who Receives Grace", "General by Grace", or "(Hereditary) General of the Fourth Rank". This rank has no sub-classes. This title is not granted per se, but were given to heirs of fengguo jiangjuns.

Regardless of title and rank, an imperial prince was addressed as "A-ge" (age), which means "lord" or "commander" in Manchu.
Comparison of imperial ranks for male members

Female members

The following titles were granted to female members of the imperial clan:

 Gulun gongzhu (gurun-i gungju), translated as "State Princess", "Gurun Princess" or "Princess of the First Rank". It was usually granted to a princess born to the Empress. "Gulun" means "all under Heaven" in Manchu.
 Heshuo gongzhu (hošo-i gungju), translated as "Heshuo Princess" or "Princess of the Second Rank". It was usually granted to a princess born to a consort or concubine. "Heshuo" ("hošo") means "four corners, four sides" in Manchu.
 Junzhu (hošo-i gege), translated as "Princess of a Commandery" or "Princess of the Third Rank". It was usually granted to the daughter of a qinwang. Also called heshuo gege (和碩格格) or qinwang gege (親王格格), lit. "lady of a prince of the blood". Daughters of qinwang also could be promoted to heshuo gongzhu or gulun gongzhu if they were adopted as emperor's daughters.
 Xianzhu (doro-i gege), translated as "Princess of a County" or "Princess of the Fourth Rank". It was usually granted to the daughter of a junwang or shizi. Also called duolun gege (多倫格格) or junwang gege (郡王格格), lit. "lady of a prince of a commandery". Could be promoted to junzhu in special circumstances.
 Junjun (beile-i jui doro-i gege), translated as "Lady of a Commandery" or "Lady of the First Rank". It was usually granted to a daughter born to a secondary consort of a qinwang or to the daughter of a beile. Also called duolun gege (多倫格格) or beile gege (貝勒格格), lit. "lady of a prince (of the third rank)". Could be promoted to xianzhu.
 Xianjun (gūsa-i gege), translated as "Lady of a County" or "Lady of the Second Rank". It was usually granted to a daughter born to a secondary consort of a junwang or to the daughter of a beizi. Also called gushan gege (固山格格), lit. "lady of a banner", or beizi gege (貝子格格), lit. "lady of a prince (of the fourth rank)".
 Xiangjun (gung-ni jui gege), translated as "Lady of a Village" or "Lady of the Third Rank". It was usually granted to the daughters of dukes with eight privileges or daughters born to a secondary consort of beile. Also called gong gege (公格格), lit. "lady of a duke".
 Zongnü, translated as "Clanswoman". This is not a granted title, but the honorific given to all daughters of dukes without eight privileges and jiangjuns, as well as all other untitled princesses. However,
 Daughters born to a secondary consort of a beizi are called wupinfeng zongnü (五品俸宗女), "clanswoman with stipend of the fifth pin".
 Daughters born to a secondary consort of a feng'en zhenguo gong or feng'en fuguo gong are called liupinfeng zongnü (六品俸宗女), "clanswoman with stipend of the sixth pin".
Comparison of titles for imperial princesses

Princesses' consorts

Efu, also known Fuma, translated as "Prince Consort". Its original meaning was "emperor's charioteer". It was usually granted to the spouse of a princess above the rank of zongnü. The efus were separated into seven ranks corresponding to the rank of the princesses the efu married. Efus who married gulun gongzhus and heshuo gongzhus held ranks equivalent to the beizis and dukes respectively. The remaining efus had equivalent official rank from the first to fifth pin.

An efu retained his title and privileges as long as the princess remained his primary spouse – even after her death. However, if an efu remarried or promoted a consort to be his primary spouse, he lost all rights obtained from his marriage to the princess.

Princess consorts 
The following titles were granted to consorts of imperial princes:

 Primary consort (嫡福晋, dí fújìn) also called Great consort (大福晋, pinyin: dà fújìn,  amba fujin), was given to the main wives of imperial princes above the rank of junwang. Imperial dukes' wives were titled Madame ( 夫人; fū rén). The main spouse of the Crown Prince was given the title “Crown Princess Consort" (皇太子妃). Primary consorts of the emperor's sons could also be entitled "Imperial Princess Consort" (皇子妃). The title “Crown Princess Consort" was equivalent to the Imperial Noble Consort, while "Imperial Princess Consort" was equivalent to Noble Consort. The title "great consort" was granted to primary consorts of Nurhaci and Hong Taiji and were equivalent to empress. Primary consorts were selected through receiving a ruyi scepter.
 Secondary consort (側福晉, pinyin: cè fújìn,  ashan-i-fujin)  was granted to secondary wives of imperial princes above the ranks of junwang. Secondary consort of crown prince was given the title "Crown Prince's Side Concubine" (皇太子侧妃). Secondary consorts of emperor's sons could also be entitled "Prince's Side Concubine" (皇子侧妃). Secondary consort were selected by receiving an embroidered fragrant pouch.
 Mistress (格格, pinyin: gégé), little consort (小福晋, pinyin: xiǎo fújìn,  ajige-i-fujin), concubine (妾, qie) or (庶福晋, pinyin: shufujin) was granted to concubines of imperial princes, dukes and generals. A mistress of the crown prince was titled "Crown Prince's Concubine" (皇太子庶妃, pinyin: huáng tàizǐ shù fēi), while a mistress of imperial prince was honoured as "Imperial Prince's Concubine" (皇子庶妃, pinyin: huángzǐ shù fēi).If the prince had more than one mistress, they could be granted honorific names derived from their birth clans names. Mistress was selected by receiving 100 taels.
If the princess consort divorced a prince or died, the second princess consort held the title of "step consort" (继福晋, pinyin: jì fújìn). Divorced princess consorts were stripped of their privileges and returned to their maiden manors. Dead primary consorts of the emperor could be posthumously honoured as empress, ex. Lady Niohuru, primary consort of Minning, Prince Zhi of the First Rank was honoured as Empress Xiaomucheng, Lady Sakda, primary consort of Yizhu was honoured as Empress Xiaodexian. The same rule was for primary consort of the imperial prince who died before the marriage, e.g. Lady Nara, primary consort of Yongkui, Prince Li of the First Rank. 

Palace maids from prince's residence could be promoted in case of princess consort's death or in case when they had children with a prince, ex. Wang Yuying, Yongxuan's servant was promoted to secondary consort. Remaining spouses could be promoted to higher positions in special circumstances, ex. lady Wanyan, Yongcheng's unranked spouse was given a title of secondary consort. 

If imperial prince ascended the throne, his primary consort was named as empress, secondary consorts were named as noble consorts, consorts  or concubines and mistresses were granted titles from first class female attendant to concubine or consort and given honorific names.  

Princess consorts held titles according to their husbands. If the prince was demoted, princess consort could be treated appropriately. After the demotion of prince, princess consort returned her regalias to the Ministry of Internal Affairs. If the prince was born in a non-iron cap cadet line, his future title depended on the position of his consort.   Nevertheless, they addressed themselves as "qie". On the other hand, princess consort was mainly addressed as "fujin" or "furen" according to the title of her husband. All princess consorts regardless of rank were listed in imperial genealogy (Jade Tables).  

Princess consorts could wear chaofu befitting imperial consorts on solemn ceremonies, but were prohibited from wearing yellow-grounded robes. The crown of princess consort had peacocks instead of phoenixes and no tiers on the finial. Princess consort wore jifu with roundels of dragons matching patterns on the surcoat of her husband and tiara with phoenixes. Imperial duchesses wore jifu with medallions of flowers like imperial consorts below the rank of noble lady.

 Comparison of imperial titles for women

Others
At the beginning of the Qing dynasty, before the rank system was formalised, non-standard titles were also used, such as:

 Da beile (' 'amba beile), translated as "Grand Beile", assumed by Daišan during the tetrarchy, and by Huangtaiji prior to his ascension.
 Zhang gongzhu, translated as "Grand Princess", "Chief Princess", "Elder Princess" or "Princess Imperial", was granted to various daughters of Nurhaci and Huangtaiji. Title could be granted to eldest daughter of the Emperor or Emperor's sister.
 Da zhang gongzhu (大长公主), translated as "Grand Princess Imperial", was never used in hierarchy, but could be granted to Emperor's paternal aunt. The only holder of this title was Gurun Princess Yongmu, daughter of Hong Taiji by Empress Dowager Xiaozhuang and aunt of the Kangxi Emperor

Non-imperial nobility

Standard non-imperial titles
The following are the nine ranks of the peerage awarded for valour, achievement, distinction, other imperial favour, and to imperial consort clans.

 Gong (gung), often referred to as min gong ("commoner duke") to differentiate from the imperial  ("imperial duke"). Translated as "Duke" or "Non-imperial Duke".
 Hou (ho), translated as "Marquis" or "Marquess".
 Bo (be), translated as "Count".

The above three ranks are chaopin, outranking official ranks. The four following ranks were all evolved from leadership ranks in the Manchu banner army, originally called  ejen (額真; "lord" or "master" in Manchu) and later  janggin (章京; "general" in Manchu).

 Zi (jinkini hafan), translated as "Viscount".
 Nan (ashan-i hafan), translated as "Baron".
 Qingche duwei (adaha hafan), translated as "Master Commandant of Light Chariot", roughly equivalent to a commander of a chivalric order.

All of the above ranks are sub-divided into four classes; in order: first class plus yunqiwei, first class, second class, and third class.

 Jiduwei (baitalabure hafan), translated as "Master Commandant of Cavalry", rough equivalent of an officer of a chivalric order. This rank is subdivided into two classes: jiduwei plus yunjiwei, and simply jiduwei.
 Yunqiwei (tuwašara hafan), translated as "Knight Commandant of the Cloud", rough equivalent of a knight bachelor.
 Enjiwei (kesingge hafan), translated as "Knight Commandant by Grace", rough equivalent of an esquire. This title was not granted per se, but bestowed on the heirs of yunjiweis without the privilege of perpetual inheritance.

Pre-standard non-imperial titles
At the beginning of the Qing dynasty, during Nurhaci's and Huangtaiji's reigns, the noble ranks were not yet standardised. Several titles were created that did not fit into the above system, mostly for defectors from the Ming dynasty. These titles were similar to the titles used in the Ming dynasty, and lack the Manchu nomenclature and the noble rank system introduced later.

 Qinwang (cin wang), "Prince of the Blood", created for Wu Sangui and Shang Kexi.
 Junwang (giyūn wang), "Prince of a Commandery", created for Fuhuan and Fukang'an.
 Wang (wang), "Prince", created for Yangguli and several Ming defectors. The relation between wang and junwang is unclear: in both Ming and Qing traditions, single-character titular names were reserved for qinwangs, while junwangs received two-character titular names, but these wangs were created with both single and two-character titular names. Both Wu Sangui and Shang Kexi were promoted from wang to qinwang, but no wang was ever promoted to junwang or vice versa.
 Beile (beile), "Lord", "Prince" or "Chief" in Manchu. It was the generic title of all Manchu lords during the Ming dynasty. Under the Qing dynasty, this title was generally reserved for imperials, but was retained by the princes of Yehe after their submission to Nurhaci.
 Beizi (beise). Normally reserved for imperials, it was uniquely created for Fukang'an, before he was further elevated to junwang.
 Chaopin Gong, "High Duke", a unique rank created for Yangguli, before he was further elevated to wang. This title ranks just below beizi and above all other dukes.
 Gong (Gung; "Duke"), Hou (ho; "Marquess"), and Bo (be; "Count"), similar to the later standard titles, but created without subclasses.

Additionally, there were banner offices that later evolved into hereditary noble titles. Despite being used as noble titles, these offices continued to exist and function in the banner hierarchy. To distinguish the noble titles from the offices, they were sometimes called "hereditary office" or "hereditary rank".

 Gūsa ejen , meaning "master of a banner", later Sinicised to become dutong, meaning "colonel";
 Evolved into zongbing, meaning "chief commander";
 Then into amba janggin , meaning "grand general";
 Then into jinkini hafan , meaning "prime officer";
 Which was finally Sinicised to become zi, meaning "viscount".
 Meiren-i ejen , meaning "vice master", Sinicised to become fu dutong, meaning "vice colonel";
 Evolved into fujiang, meaning "vice general";
 Then into meiren-i janggin , meaning "vice general";
 Then into ashan-i hafan , meaning "vice officer";
 Which was finally Sinicised to become nan, meaning "baron".
 Jalan ejen , meaning "master of a sub-banner", Sinicised to become canling, meaning "staff captain";
 Evolved into canjiang, meaning "staff general", or youji, meaning "vanguard" or "skirmish leader";
 Then into jalan janggin , meaning "general of a sub-banner";
 Then into adaha hafan , meaning "chariot officer";
 Which was finally Sinicised to become qingche duwei, meaning "master commandant of light chariot".
 Niru ejen , meaning "master of an arrow" (an "arrow" was a basic unit of a banner army), later Sinicised to become zuoling, meaning "assistant captain";
 Evolved into beiyu, meaning "rearguard";
 Then into niru janggin , meaning "general of an arrow";
 Then into baitalabura hafan , meaning "adjutant officer";
 Which was finally Sinicised to become ji duwei, meaning "master commandant of cavalry".

 Comparison of non-imperial nobility titles 

Notable titles
 Duke Yansheng ("Duke Overflowing with Sagacity), granted to the heirs of the senior northern branch of Confucius in Qufu.
 Duke Haicheng ("Duke East of the Sea"), granted to Ming loyalist Zheng Keshuang, the once independent king of the Taiwan-based Kingdom of Tungning who surrendered to the Qing Empire in 1683, and his heirs.
 Duke Cheng'en (承恩公, Chéng‘ēn Gōng, "Duke Who Receives Grace"), granted to fathers and brothers of empresses. This title had 3 subclasses.
 First Class Duke Zhongyong (一等忠勇公,Yīděng Zhōngyǒng Gōng, "Duke of Loyalty and Courage"), granted to Fuca Fuheng for Xinjiang campaign.
 Count Zhongcheng ("Count of Loyalty and Sincerity"), granted to Feng Xifan, a former Ming loyalist official in the Kingdom of Tungning.
 Marquis Jinghai ("Marquis Pacifying the Sea"), granted to Shi Lang and his heirs.
 Hereditary Magistrate of Guogan County, granted to Ming loyalist Yang Guohua (楊國華/杨国华), the ruler of the Kokang region in present-day Myanmar.
 Marquis Yan'en ("Marquis of Extended Grace"), granted to the heads of a cadet branch of the House of Zhu, the imperial clan of the Ming dynasty.
 Count Zhaoxin, granted to Li Shiyao (李侍堯), a descendant of Li Yongfang (李永芳).
 First Class Marquis Yiyong (； “Marquis of Determination and Courage"), granted to Zeng Guofan and his descendants.
 Second Class Marquis Kejing ("Marquis of Respect and Tranquility" ), granted to Zuo Zongtang and his descendants.
 First Class Marquis Suyi (”Marquis of Peace and Determination"), granted to Li Hongzhang and his descendants.

 Non-imperial nobility titles for women 

Mingfu (命妇, Mìngfù; "noblewoman") was granted to wives of officials, non-imperial aristocrates and collateral clanswomen. Also, mothers of imperial consorts were granted a title of "mingfu" according to the rank held by her daughter as well as sisters of imperial consorts and fujins.  Noblewomen were divided into 7 ranks according to the rank of her husband and her daughter, if her daughter was an imperial consort. If the title held by mingfus' husbands was divided into subclasses, they could be treated equally. Mingfus holding rank equivalent to wives of imperial generals conducted court ceremonies, ex. promotions of imperial consort, weddings of princes and princesses (if they married into Manchu or Han family) and rites, while lower rank ladies attended to them. 

Mingfu, whose husband was granted a title above the rank system (Duke, Marquis or Count), was treated similarly to imperial duchess, but enjoyed less privileges than imperial clanswoman.  Collateral Gioro ladies were treated as mingfu from 1st to 3rd rank. Noblewomen were addressed as "furen" ("Madam") regardless of rank.

However， 

 Wives of officials who received nobility title, were ranked according to the rank held by their husbands and could be further promoted. Sometimes, mingfus were given honorifical names, ex. Tatara Meixian, primary spouse of Niohuru Lingzhu, was styled as "Madam of Gaoming" by Kangxi Emperor personally. 
 Sisters of imperial consorts, who weren't members of imperial family (primary consorts or imperial consorts) were given a title of mingfu and receive a title according to the position of their husbands.  
 Mingfu retained her title even after divorce if her sister or daughter was imperial consort. 
 Wives and mothers of dukes and aristocrats, who received pre-standard titles could be addressed as "fujin" – a title typical for imperial princess consort. For example, mother of Fuk'anggan, lady Yehenara was mentioned and addressed as "fujin", as a mother of Prince Jiayong of the Second Rank (嘉勇郡王). Fukang'an's wife, lady Irgen Gioro was also addressed as "fujin". Their names were not listed in Jade Tables.
 Close friends and servants of imperial consorts who weren't members of ruling clan could receive a title of mingfu and rarely could be addressed as "gege". Although Sumalagu,a confidant of Empress Dowager Xiaozhuang, was entitled as mingfu, grand empress dowager Xiaozhuang addressed her as "gege" (imperial princess).

Differently to imperial clanswomen, mingfus wore crowns with three bejeweled plaques and finial consisting of one coral, silk bandeaus with embroidered golden dragons chasing after a flaming pearl and blue-grounded chaofu on solemn ceremonies. Lower- ranking ladies could not wear surcoats with roundels of flowers and auspicious symbols unlike imperial duchesses and clanswomen. Collateral clanswomen could wear surcoats with rampant four-clawed dragons above the magnificent sea-waves pattern (lishui) and white caishui (pointed kerchief fastened to the robe like a pendant). Wives of officials wore sleeveless vest matching Mandarin square of her husband and Ming Dynasty style tiaras, as depicted on ancestral portraits. 

Civil and honorary titles
With a few exceptions, the above titles were, in principle, created for only military merits. There were also titles for civil officials.

While there were a few Manchu civil titles, the most important civil titles followed the Han Chinese Confucian tradition, derived from high bureaucratic offices or imperial household offices that evolved into honorary sinecures. These were sometimes granted as special privileges, but also often as a practical means of conferring official rank promotion without giving specific responsibilities. Examples of such titles were taibao (太保; "Grand Protector"), shaoshi (少師; "Junior Preceptor"), taizi taifu (太子太傅; "Grand Tutor of the Crown Prince"),  furen (夫人, "Madam"/“Lady") and dafu (大夫; "Gentleman"). These titles were non-heritable.

In addition, there were also honorary and hereditary titles granted to religious and cultural leaders, such as:

 Wujing Boshi, a title used in the Hanlin Academy. It was awarded the southern branch of Confucius's descendants in Quzhou, and Mencius's descendants in Zoucheng, as well as descendants of Confucian sages (e.g. Confucius's disciples and prominent Neo-Confucian scholars), and descendants of Guan Yu and the Duke of Zhou. There were 22 of them. Zhang Zai's descendants received the "Wujing Boshi" appointment along with those of Zhu Xi, Cheng Hao, Cheng Yi and Zhou Dunyi.
 Zhengyi Si Jiao Zhenren, an honorary title awarded to Zhang Daoling's descendants and the Celestial Masters.

Ranks of protectorates and tributary states

The Qing imperial court also granted titles to princes of its protectorates and tributary states, mainly in Mongolia, Xinjiang and Tibet. The vassal titles were generally inherited in perpetuity without downgrading.

The ranks roughly mirrored those of the imperial clan, with a few differences:
 Han (han), ranked higher than qinwang, and ranked only below the Emperor and the Crown Prince in the Qing hierarchy. Sometimes also called hanwang ("Khan-King"). The Emperor also used the title of dahan ("Great Khan") instead of Emperor in communiqués to the Central Asian states.
 Vassal princes who did not have the "Eight Privileges". There were no distinctions between dukes with or without the "Eight Privileges". There were only two ducal ranks: zhenguo gong and fuguo gong.
 Instead of the jiangjun ranks, the vassal lords held these titles:
 Taiji (tayiji), for members of the Borjigin clan.
 Tabunang (tabunang), for descendants of Jelme.

The taiji and tabunang are equal in rank, and both subdivided into five classes: jasagh, first class, second class, third class, and fourth class. Jasagh is chaopin, above official ranks, while the rest were equivalent to the first to fourth pin.

Under the tusi system, the Qing Empire also recognised various local tribal chieftainships of ethnic minority tribes. This was mainly applied in the mountain regions of Yunnan, but also in western and northern borderlands. They were the Chiefdom of Bathang, Chiefdom of Chuchen, Chiefdom of Lijiang, Chiefdom of Lithang, Chiefdom of Mangshi, Chiefdom of Tsanlha, Chiefdom of Yao'an, Chiefdom of Yongning, Mu'ege Chiefdom of Muli and Chiefdom of Langqu.

The Qing Empire had two vassals in Xinjiang, the Kumul Khanate and the Turfan Khanate.

Other honours and privileges
In addition to systematized rank titles listed above, there were also other honorific titles and privileges, mostly non-heritable:

 There were various Mongol/Manchu/Turkic titles, granted mainly to non-Han vassals and officials. Bitesi, baksi, jarguci were civil honours, while baturu, daicing, cuhur were military honours. Jasagh was granted to vassals with autonomous power, while darhan was a hereditary title divided into three classes. These titles were mostly awarded to Manchus and Mongols in the early Qing dynasty, but gradually fell out of use as the court became increasingly Sinicised.
 The privilege of wearing feathers on the mandarin hat; this privilege was known as lingyu:
 Peacock feathers were usually worn by imperial princes, prince consorts, imperial bodyguards and some high-ranking officials. Exceptionally, peacock feathers may be granted as a special honour. Two-eyed and three-eyed feathers were very rarely bestowed – only seven peers ever received the three-eyed feathers, while two dozens received the two-eyed feathers.
 Blue feathers were usually worn by household officials of the imperial and princely houses. Like peacock feathers, blue feathers may be granted as a special honour, usually to officials of the sixth pin and below.
 Although a badge of honour, the feathers also symbolised bond servitude to the Emperor. As such, direct imperial clansmen and imperial princes ranked beile and above were prohibited from wearing feathers.
 The privilege of wearing the yellow jacket ("yellow jacket of martial merit"). This is usually the uniform of imperial bodyguards, but it could also be bestowed upon anyone by the Emperor. A rare honour in the early Qing dynasty, it was diluted through excessive grants in the late Qing era. The jacket may only be worn in the Emperor's presence.
 The privilege of wearing imperial girdles (to both the recipient and his issue):
 The yellow girdles were normally reserved for direct imperial clansmen, but may be granted to collateral imperial clansmen, known as gioro as an honour. The yellow girdle entitled the wearer to be tried by the Imperial Clan Court as opposed to the general or banner courts.
 The red girdles were normally reserved for collateral imperial clansmen, or gioro, as well as demoted direct imperial clansmen. Non-imperials may be granted the Gioro surname and be adopted into the imperial clan, thus the privilege of wearing the red girdle.
 The purple girdles were normally reserved for demoted gioro. Uniquely, the family of Dahai, the "saint of Manchu" and the inventor of the Manchu script, was granted the privilege of wearing purple girdles, to symbolise his family as the "second clan of Manchu (inferior only to the Aisin-Gioro)".
 Enshrinement in the Imperial Ancestral Temple. Granted to deceased peers (and sometimes also their wives), therefore a privilege for all his descendants. They were worshipped alongside the imperial ancestors, and their descendants had the privilege of sending representatives to participate in the imperial ancestral rituals. Imperial and Mongol princes were housed in the east wing of the temple, while the others were housed in the west wing. This was an extremely high honour, granted only 27 times throughout the Qing dynasty. Zhang Tingyu was the only Han subject to ever receive this honour, while Heling was the only person to have this honour revoked.
 Bestowal of Manchu, noble or imperial surnames. Occasionally, a non-Manchu subject would be granted a Manchu surname, or a Manchu would be granted a more prestigious surname, or even the imperial surname "Gioro", thus adopting into the imperial clan.
 Promotion within the banner hierarchy:
 A non-bannerman can be inducted into the banner system.
 A Han bannerman (nikan gūsa) may be elevated into a Manchu banner (manju gūsa).
 A bannerman from the lower banners (plain red, bordered red, bordered white, plain blue, and bordered blue banners) can be elevated into the upper banners (plain yellow, bordered yellow, and plain white). This was especially common for the imperial consorts and their clansmen.
 Court beads. The court beads were part of the court uniform; the length of the beads normally corresponded to the courtier's pin. When a courtier kowtowed, the beads must touch the ground. Longer court beads were granted as a special favour regardless of the courtier's pin. This was often granted to elderly courtiers to relieve them of the physical hardship of kowtowing.
 The Spencer Museum of Art has six long pao robes (dragon robes) that belonged to Han Chinese nobility of the Qing dynasty. Ranked officials and Han Chinese nobles had two slits in the skirts while Manchu nobles and the Imperial family had 4 slits in skirts. All first, second and third rank officials as well as Han Chinese and Manchu nobles were entitled to wear 9 dragons by the Qing Illustrated Precedents. Qing sumptuary laws only allowed four clawed dragons for officials, Han Chinese nobles and Manchu nobles while the Qing Imperial family, emperor and princes up to the second degree and their female family members were entitled to wear five clawed dragons. However officials violated these laws all the time and wore 5 clawed dragons and the Spencer Museum's 6 long pao worn by Han Chinese nobles have 5 clawed dragons on them.
Traditional Ming dynasty Hanfu robes given by the Ming Emperors to the Chinese noble Dukes Yansheng descended from Confucius are still preserved in the Confucius Mansion after over five centuries. 
Robes from the Qing emperors are also preserved there. The Jurchens in the Jin dynasty and Mongols in the Yuan dynasty continued to patronize and support the Confucian Duke Yansheng.

Etymology of Manchu titles
With only a few exceptions, most Manchu titles ultimately derived from Han Chinese roots.

 Han, used by the Emperor himself and a few Mongol lords, was borrowed from the Turko-Mongol Khan, Khaan or Khagan. In Manchu, however, the word is written slightly differently for the Emperor and other Khans.
 Beile was usually considered an indigenous Manchu title, evolved from earlier Jurchen bojile, which may ultimately be derived from the Turkic title bey or beg or even Chinese bo (伯, "count").
 Beise was originally the plural form of beile, but later evolved into a separate title.
 Janggin derived from the Chinese military title jiangjun (將軍, "general"). In Manchu, however, janggin evolved into a nominal title distinct from the military office, which is translated in Manchu as jiyanggiyūn.
 Taiji or tayiji derived from Chinese taizi (太子, "crown prince"). In Chinese, it was used exclusively by heirs of imperial, royal or princely titles. Among the Mongols, however, the Borjigits have long used it as a distinct title.
 Tabunang ("son-in-law") was originally the title given to a Mongol prince consort who married a Borjigit princess. It was granted to Jelme, and his descendants continued to use this title.
 Fujin (福晉) is a consort of a prince ranked junwang or above. This word evolved from Chinese furen (夫人; "lady", "madame" or "wife"), but was reserved for high-ranked ladies. Furen was used by lower-ranked married ladies.
 A-ge (阿哥) is a Manchu word meaning both "lord, chief" and "elder brother". It is derived from the Mongolic word aka, and cognate with the Turkic word agha''.

See also
 Chinese nobility
 Mongolian nobility

References

Chinese nobility
Qing dynasty princely peerages